Holudar-e Pain (also Romanized as Holūdar-e Pā’īn, Ḩalūdar-e Pā’īn, and Haludar Pā’īn; also known as Ḩalūdar) is a village in Barakuh Rural District, Jolgeh-e Mazhan District, Khusf County, South Khorasan Province, Iran. At the 2006 census, its population was 36, in 12 families.

References 

Populated places in Khusf County